Nikolaj Hammelsvang Kirk (born 19 March 1998) is a Danish professional footballer who plays as a central midfielder or full back. He is a product of the FC Midtjylland academy and represented Denmark at youth level.

Club career

FC Midtjylland 
A central midfielder, Kirk began his career with spells at Grønbjerg IF, Spjald IF and Vildbjerg SF, before joining the academy at Superliga club FC Midtjylland in 2013. He progressed to sign a five-year professional contract in September 2016 and spent the 2017–18, 2018–19 and 2019–20 seasons away on loan. Kirk transferred away from the club in August 2020.

Brentford (loans) 
On 22 June 2017, Kirk joined the B team at Championship club Brentford on loan for the duration of the 2017–18 season. He made 34 appearances, scored one goal and rejoined the club on loan for the 2018–19 season. Kirk captained the B team and played as a utility player in defence and midfield during the campaign. He won his maiden call into the first team squad for an FA Cup fifth round match versus Swansea City on 17 February 2019 and made the first senior appearance of his career as a substitute for Saïd Benrahma after 69 minutes of the 4–1 defeat. Kirk's loan was terminated in March 2019, by which time he had made 71 appearances for Brentford B.

Stabæk (loan) 
On 31 March 2019, Kirk joined Norwegian Eliteserien club Stabæk on loan until 25 July 2019. He made just six appearances before his loan was terminated early.

FC Fredericia (loan) 
On 20 July 2019, Kirk joined Danish 1st Division club FC Fredericia on a loan which was later extended until the end of the 2019–20 season. He made 11 appearances and scored two goals during his spell.

Aarhus Fremad 
On 5 August 2020, Kirk signed a two-year contract with Danish 2nd Division club Aarhus Fremad. He made 22 appearances and scored 2 goals during the 2020–21 season. Kirk missed the entire 2021–22 season due to an achilles injury.

International career 
Kirk was capped by Denmark between U16 and U18 level.

Career statistics

References

External links 

1998 births
Danish men's footballers
Denmark youth international footballers
Danish expatriate men's footballers
Expatriate footballers in England
Danish expatriate sportspeople in England
FC Midtjylland players
Brentford F.C. players
Association football defenders
Association football midfielders
Living people
Danish expatriate sportspeople in Norway
Stabæk Fotball players
Expatriate footballers in Norway
Eliteserien players
FC Fredericia players
Danish 1st Division players
Aarhus Fremad players
Sportspeople from the Central Denmark Region
People from Ringkøbing-Skjern Municipality